Lego Star Wars: Summer Vacation is a 2022 animated special based on the Star Wars franchise, and produced by Lucasfilm Animation and The Lego Group alongside Atomic Cartoons. Like The Lego Star Wars Holiday Special, it is directed by Ken Cunningham from a script written by David Shayne. A stand-alone sequel to the Star Wars sequel trilogy, the special was released on Disney+ on August 5, 2022.

Plot 
Following the events of Star Wars: The Rise of Skywalker, Rey, Finn, Poe, Chewbacca, BB-8, R2-D2 and C-3PO seek a relaxing summer vacation aboard Lando Calrissian's luxury Halcyon starcruiser. After being separated from the group on Calrissian's starcruiser, Finn talks to the Force ghost of Obi-Wan Kenobi. Kenobi tells Finn of his previous summer adventures. With Lt. Valeria, a younger Obi-Wan Kenobi dressed in a Hawaiian shirt sneaks into Jabba the Hutt's Palace on Tatooine in order to steal coaxium. Kenobi was originally meant to act as a distraction for Jabba but he performs a musical number called "Gamorrean Girls" alongside Jabba's dancer Sy Snootles.

Anakin Skywalker's Force ghost tells Finn about a trip he once took Emperor Palpatine to as Darth Vader during Empire Day. He takes him to the planet of Scarif, where the original Death Star plans were held.

Princess Leia's Force ghost tells Finn about a trip she and Han Solo took the young Ben Solo on when he was a child before receiving Luke Skywalker's Jedi training. While traveling to Mimban, where Han first met Chewbacca, Ben is unimpressed. Wanting to impress him, Han takes him to the forest moon of Endor, where the Battle of Endor took place. They are greeted by tourist Wick Cooper, whose daughter Ben has a crush on. A show-off joins them and belittles Ben for being short. After taking the Millennium Falcon, Ben flies at the ground and after dropping off Wick's daughter, Han, Leia, C-3PO, R2-D2, and Chewbacca drop Ben off at Luke's Jedi Academy.

Voice cast

Release 
Lego Star Wars: Summer Vacation was first announced on May 27, 2022 at Star Wars Celebration. It was released on Disney+ on August 5, 2022.

Marketing 
A teaser trailer for Lego Star Wars: Summer Vacation was released on June 18, 2022.
The full-length official trailer for the special was released on June 23, 2022. Lucasfilm released the official poster in July 2022 alongside showing a one minute clip to the audience of San Diego Comic-Con On July 24. The clip was released to the public the following day.

Reception 
The review aggregator website Rotten Tomatoes reported an approval rating of 88%, with an average rating of 6.7/10, based on 8 reviews.88%

Maggie Lovitt  of Collider.com gave it an A grade and wrote: "Meta-filled mayhem that plays on some of the corniest and most familiar Star Wars tropes is the perfect piece of cinema for long summer nights." 
Tara Bennett of IGN gave it 7 out of 10 and wrote: "LEGO Star Wars Summer Vacation wraps up the trilogy of sequel character specials with an emotional conclusion and some very funny summer riffs on beloved characters."
CineMovie gave it a B+ grade.
The Times rated it 1 out of 5 and called it "another dud".

References

External links
 
 

2022 films
2022 animated films
Lego Star Wars films
American children's animated action films
American children's animated adventure films
Films about vacationing